Wedderburn is a suburb of Sydney, in the state of New South Wales, Australia. Wedderburn is located 57 kilometres south-west of the Sydney central business district, in the local government area of the City of Campbelltown and is part of the Macarthur region.

Wedderburn is the only Campbelltown suburb on the right bank of the Georges River. The steep gorge and heavy bush, gives it a small country town atmosphere, rather than a suburb. The causeway on Wedderburn Road, which provides the main link to Campbelltown, is known to flood during heavy rain, increasing Wedderburn's isolation.

A small airport, Wedderburn Airport operated by the New South Wales Sports Aircraft Club is located to the south of the suburb.

History
Wedderburn was originally home to the Tharawal people and settlers from European backgrounds didn't come to the area until the 1880s. In clearing the land, they established orchards which are still used today. The first Wedderburn Bridge was built in 1892 and a school and post office were established in 1896. Electricity didn't reach Wedderburn until 1952. Increasing environmental awareness has seen Campbelltown Council keen to protect the gorges around Wedderburn and O'Hare's Creek Gorge to the east is set to become a national park.

Notable residents
 Gracius Joseph Broinowski (1837-1913), a Polish-born artist and ornithologist who published a six-volume book on the birds of Australia.
Kevin O'Keefe OAM and Julie O'Keefe, entrepreneurs and philanthropists.
Dr Ross Field
Dr Lakshman Prasad, prominent medical practitioner in Campbelltown and philanthropist
Kath Robinson, senior lecturer at The University of Sydney
 David Fairbairn (artist) (1949 - ), artist and winner of the Dobell Drawing prize 1999 and the Doug Moran National Portrait Prize in 2002.

Artists from the Widden Weddin group:

 John Peart (1946-2013), artist and winner of the Wynne Prize in 1997 and the Sulman Prize in 2000.
 Elisabeth Cummings (1934-), prominent artist.

References

Suburbs of Sydney
Towns in the Macarthur (New South Wales)
City of Campbelltown (New South Wales)